Unicorn Variations is a collection of stories and essays by American author Roger Zelazny, published in 1983.

Contents
"Introduction"
"Unicorn Variation"
"The Last of the Wild Ones" (a follow-up short story to the earlier story "Devil Car")
"Recital"
"The Naked Matador"
"The Parts That Are Only Glimpsed: Three Reflexes" (essay)
"Dismal Light" (a follow-up short story to the novel Isle of the Dead)
"Go Starless in the Night"
"But Not the Herald"
"A Hand Across the Galaxy"
"The Force That Through the Circuit Drives the Current" (a short story that plays with themes developed in "Home is the Hangman")
"Home is the Hangman" (also in the collection My Name Is Legion)
"Fire and /or Ice"
"Exeunt Omnes"
"A Very Good Year"
"My Lady of the Diodes"
"And I Only Am Escaped to Tell Thee"
"The Horses of Lir"
"The Night Has 999 Eyes"
"Angel, Dark Angel"
"Walpurgisnacht"
"The George Business"
"Some Science Fiction Parameters: A Biased View" (essay)

References

Short story collections by Roger Zelazny
1983 short story collections